Bernard Eugene Giles (born April 9, 1953) is an American serial killer and rapist who killed five girls and women in Titusville, Florida between September and November 1973. Following his arrest, he fully admitted his guilt and was sentenced to several life imprisonment terms in 1974.

Early life 
Giles was born on April 9, 1953, in a Titusville family with three other children. His parents led a law-abiding lifestyle and were described as good, caring parents, thanks to which Giles had a happy childhood and grew up in a stable home. Most of his friends described him in a very positive manner. He attended Titusville High School, where he took an interest in visual arts. He achieved some success in this field, but soon lost interest in studying as a whole. Due to chronic absenteeism and poor academic performance, he was forced to leave school at age 16, after which he mastered the trade of an electrician and began working. In 1972, he married 17-year-old Leslie Jo Ann, who gave birth to a daughter in July 1973.

Murders 
As victims, Giles would choose young girls, most of whom hitchhiked. Their bodies were found, in some cases raped, in orange groves or wooded areas in Brevard County. 

Nancy Gerry, 18, disappeared on September 26, 1973. Her fully clothed body was found in a palmetto thicket, shot in the head, on December 10, 1973.

Paula Darlene Hamric, 22, disappeared November 17, 1973. Her nude body was found strangled, hands bound, eight days later.

Carolyn Jan Bennett, 17, disappeared on November 15, 1973. Her skeleton was found on Christmas Day. She had been shot in the head.

Sharon Mary Wilmer, 14, disappeared on November 5, 1973. She was found strangled, wearing only a St. Christopher's necklace; her shirt and sweater were found near her remains.

Krista Jean Melton, 14, was reported missing on November 14, 1973. Her fully clothed body was found shot in the head on January 31, 1974.

Arrest 
On December 10, 1973, Giles lured two underage hitchhikers into his car and drove them to the woodlands outside Titusville, where he attempted to attack them. The victims fiercely resisted, which caused Giles to draw his gun to shoot them, but his pistol malfunctioned and misfired, and the girls managed to escape. They went to police, where they provided a description of their attacker's appearance, his car, and even his name, which they had glimpsed in a book while riding in his car. On the next day, Giles was arrested and his car was examined, during which investigators seized a 22-caliber pistol. He was charged with assault and attempted rape. Following Giles' arrest, he was investigated as a suspect in the disappearances of more than 11 girls who had been reported missing since August 1973 and the murders of several others, but in January of the following year, most of the missing girls were located, and Giles was no longer suspected.

Court 
While sifting through the cases, a forensic ballistic examination confirmed that Gerry had been killed with a revolver belonging to Giles, and he was subsequently charged with her murder. He insisted on his innocence, and in early 1974, his lawyers filed a motion for a forensic medical examination, which was granted. In the spring, two independent examinations were conducted, which determined that Giles did not suffer from any mental illnesses or abnormalities. He was declared sane, and a trial date was scheduled for April 29, 1974.

The Brevard County State Attorney's Office said that if convicted, they would seek the death penalty against Giles. Unable to withstand the moral pressure, shortly before the opening of the trial, Giles made a plea bargain with the investigators. He confessed to the murder of Hamric, and during the trial, pled guilty to the murders of the three remaining girls, as well as a series of non-lethal attacks and attempted murders against others. Giles admitted that he had been prone to violence from the age of six, often playing games in which he imitated killing the other participant. He claimed to have enjoyed pretend-strangling his childhood friend, who played the role of a witch in one of the games, which was confirmed by a number of acquaintances from that period. According to his testimony, he began to make his first attempts to attack girls in 1969, after dropping out of school, but was unsuccessful. Due to the plea bargain terms, he was spared the death penalty, and on August 13, 1974, was given several terms of life imprisonment.

Aftermath 
After his conviction, Giles was transported to serve his sentence at the Florida State Prison in Bradford County. In October 1979, Giles escaped with two other prisoners. With the help of a few hand-made smoke grenades, he and his accomplices managed to distract the guard dogs and the prison guards, after which, using locksmithing tools, they managed to make a small gap in several rows of wire through which they escaped. In the subsequent search, police staked out his ex-wife's house, as they had received a tip that Giles was planning to kidnap his daughter from his ex-wife, but he was found five miles away from the prison, 26 hours after escaping. He was found guilty of escape and given an additional 15 years imprisonment.

Since then, Giles has been moved around various penitentiaries around the state. In 2019, he received a second wave of fame after British journalist and TV host Piers Morgan visited Giles in prison to conduct an interview for one of his new segments.

See also
 List of prison escapes
 List of serial killers in the United States

External links
 Confessions of a Serial Killer with Piers Morgan - Bernard Giles

References 

1953 births
20th-century American criminals
American escapees
American male criminals
American murderers of children
American people convicted of murder
American rapists
American serial killers
Criminals from Florida
Escapees from Florida detention
Living people
Male serial killers
People from Titusville, Florida
Prisoners sentenced to life imprisonment by Florida